Robert Redfield (December 4, 1897 – October 16, 1958) was an American anthropologist and ethnolinguist, whose ethnographic work in Tepoztlán, Mexico, is considered a landmark of Latin American ethnography. He was associated with the University of Chicago for his entire career: all of his higher education took place there, and he joined the faculty in 1927 and remained there until his death in 1958, serving as Dean of Social Sciences from 1934 to 1946.

Career
In 1923 he and his wife Margaret Park Redfield traveled to Mexico, where he met Manuel Gamio, a Mexican anthropologist who had studied with Franz Boas. Redfield graduated from the University of Chicago with a degree in Communication Studies, eventually with a J.D. from its law school and then a Ph.D. in cultural anthropology, which he began to teach in 1927. He was elected to the American Philosophical Society in 1947 and the American Academy of Arts and Sciences in 1950. After a series of published field studies from Mexican communities (Tepoztlán in Morelos and Chan Kom in Yucatán), in 1953 he published The Primitive World and its Transformation and in 1956, Peasant Society and Culture. Moving further into a broader synthesis of disciplines, Redfield embraced a forum for interdisciplinary thought that included archeology, anthropological linguistics, physical anthropology, cultural anthropology, and ethnology.

Redfield wrote in 1955 about his own experience doing research in Latin America on peasants. As he did research, he realized he had been trained to treat the society as an isolated culture. However, he found people were involved with trade, and there were connections between villages and states. More than that, the village culture was not bounded. Beliefs and practices were not isolated. Redfield realized it did not make sense to study people as isolated units, but rather it would be better to understand a broader perspective. Traditionally, anthropologists studied folk ways in the "little tradition", taking into account broader civilization, the "great tradition". He was elected a Fellow of the American Academy of Arts and Sciences in 1950.

One of Redfield's students at the University of Chicago was well-known novelist Kurt Vonnegut. Vonnegut was influenced by Redfield's theories and references them in his novel Slapstick Vonnegut recalls:
when I went to the University of Chicago, and I heard the head of the Department of Anthropology, Robert Redfield, lecture on the folk society, which was essentially a stable, isolated extended family, he did not have to tell me how nice that could be.

Personal life
Redfield was the son-in-law of University of Chicago sociologist Robert E. Park. Redfield and his wife Margaret were the parents of Lisa Redfield Peattie, Professor Emerita at the Massachusetts Institute of Technology; James M. Redfield, a professor of classics at the University of Chicago; and Joanna Redfield Gutmann (1930–2009). Another son, Robert (called Tito), died at the age of twelve from injuries suffered in a sledding accident.

Redfield died in October 1958 from complications of lymphatic leukemia.

The papers of Robert and Margaret Redfield are located at the Special Collections Research Center, University of Chicago Library.

Published works
Redfield's published works include:
 Tepoztlan, a Mexican Village: A Study in Folk Life.  Chicago: University of Chicago Press (1930).
 Folk Cultures of the Yucatán.  Chicago: University of Chicago Press (1948).
 The Primitive World and Its Transformations.  Ithaca: Cornell University Press (1953).
 The Role of Cities in Economic Development and Cultural Change.  Chicago: University of Chicago Press (1954).
 The Little Community.  Chicago: University of Chicago Press (1956).
 Talk with a Stranger.  Stamford, Connecticut: Overbrook Press (1958).

See also
 Fei Xiaotong
 Melville J. Herskovits
 Katherine Dunham

References

External links
 
 Guide to the Robert Redfield Papers 1917-1958

1897 births
1958 deaths
20th-century American anthropologists
20th-century Mesoamericanists
American expatriates in Mexico
American Mesoamericanists
Fellows of the American Academy of Arts and Sciences
Mesoamerican anthropologists
University of Chicago alumni
University of Chicago faculty
Members of the American Philosophical Society